{{Infobox school
| name = Maxwell School
| native_name = SMK Maxwell
| logo = 
| image = 
| alt = 
| caption = 
| motto = Latin: Disco Ut Serviam  English: I Learn That I May Serve  Malay: Berilmu, Beramal| streetaddress = Jalan Tun Ismail, 50480, Kuala Lumpur, Malaysia
| city = 
| state = 
| province = 
| country = 
| coordinates = 
| type = All-boys secondary school
| established = 
| founder = 
| status = Operational
| closed = 
| district = 
| category = 
| oversight = 
| chairman = 
| dean = 
| administrator = 
| rector = 
| principal = Norlaila Binti Ismail
| campus_director = 
| headmaster = 
| head = 
| chaplain = 
| faculty = 
| teaching_staff = 
| grades = Form 1 - Form 6
| gender = Male  Co-ed: Form 6
| enrollment =
| houses = Thamboosamy (red)  Swettenham (green)  Yap Ah Loy (blue)  Sulaiman (yellow)
| colours = Royal Green, Yellow and Blue
| athletics = 
| mascot = 
| nickname = 
| rival = 
| accreditation = 
| national_ranking = 
| test_name = 
| test_average = 
| newspaper = 
| yearbook = The Burning Tiger
| affiliations = Malaysia Ministry Of Education
| website = 
| footnotes = 
| picture = 
| picture_caption = 
| picture2 = 
| picture_caption2 = 
| category_label = 
| gender_label = 
| affiliation = 
| assst_admin = 
| president = 
| chairman_label = 
| asst principal = 
| head_name = Second Master
| head_name2 = Assistant Headmaster
| head2 = 
| officer_in_charge = 
| grades_label = 
| latitude = 
| longitude = 
| campus = Small school campus, at the edge of the city centre
| colors = 
| student_union = 
| free_label = Emblem
| free_text = 
| free_label_1 = Slogan
| free_1 = Maxwell, Hebat! & Maxwell Dihatiku. 
| free_label_2 = Alumni
| free_2 = Maxwellian Old Boys' Association  
| free_label_3 = 
| free_3 = 
}}

Maxwell School is an all-boys secondary school, located north of Kuala Lumpur. The school is believed to be the oldest school in north of Kuala Lumpur as well as one of the oldest in Kuala Lumpur and Malaysia. Both current students and alumnus are known as a Maxwellian. A centennial ceremony, celebrating the school's 100th anniversary since its establishment, was held on 30 September 2017.

History
Maxwell School was established in 1917, and named after a road in honour of Sir William George Maxwell. It opened its doors to 110 students and five teaching staff on 1 June 1922. During its pre-war days, it functioned as a feeder school (primary school) to the Victoria Institution. By 1933, the school was shut down to the public due to the recession, but was opened as a private school from 1934 to 1938. It was then given to the Trade School for their use.

During the Japanese Occupation, it was used as a camp for the Japanese Kempeitai. After the war, the school was used as a hostel by the newly formed Technical College until 1953, when, in September, the school was re-opened as Malaya's first modern secondary school. Today, the Maxwell School is still housed in the same building and has remained a secondary school ever since.

School crest
Mr. Donald Priestley designed the school crest in 1954. It is green, yellow, blue and white, with each colour having a meaning:
 green represents religion,
 yellow represents royalty,
 blue represents age,
 white represents youth.
The shield shows a tiger, an opened bible, the school motto, a compass which supports the opened book and an arrow pointing down surrounded by eight blue and white stripes. The opened book is the Bible Of Knowledge and the tiger is The Burning Tiger. The compass symbolises the school's status as a modern secondary school, offering technical and vocational subjects at that period of time. The school motto – Disco Ut Serviam – is the Latin for I Learn That I May Serve.

Campus
The school has remained on its original site. It originally consisted of two blocks, the present day main block and the gymnasium block, which now is a meeting room. The design and features of the two blocks are typical of colonial era structures and bear some similarities with the railway station and Sultan Abdul Samad buildings, both of which have Moorish architecture. The school was later extended to a block of solid masonry construction with arched openings along the corridors. There is a veranda on both sides of each storey of the main block, high ceilings and broad stairways. The 'H' shape of the main block is locally a distinctive feature. The school since have expanded, and now the school has two additional main blocks. The first of which are located behind the original 1917 block, housing most of the classrooms and laboratories, and a new 6-storey tower that houses most of the Form Sixth classrooms and the school library.

Student life
Sports
Maxwell School participates in the Sentul zone at district level and in the MSSKL (Kuala Lumpur School Sports Council) tournament at the state level. The school has won trophies and titles in football, hockey, athletics, cricket, sepak takraw and badminton. Maxwell School has produced Malaysian sportsmen including Zainal Abidin Hassan, E.C. Dutton (national goalkeeper) S.A. Azman (national tennis player) and national cricket players.

Rivalry
St. John's Institution, is the school's traditional rivals. This rivalry can be observed during visits by Maxwellians to St. John's Institution and vice versa. Setapak High School, Ampang Road Boys School and the Methodist Boys School, Sentul can also be included in this list, stretching back to the mid-1950s.

House
There are four sport houses, and every year they compete on sports day. The Maxwell School Sports Day has been held since 1955. The houses are named after the founders of the state. The houses are:
 Thamboosamy (red)
 Swettenham (green)
 Yap Ah Loy (blue)
 Sulaiman (yellow)

Prefects
Maxwell School has one of the oldest prefects board in Malaysia and Southeast Asia. It was founded 1929. After the war, the Prefects Board was re-initiated and the first School Captain was S. A. Azman in 1954. He later became one of Malaya's first national tennis players.

Choosing prefects is done by nomination for prefecture by teachers and senior students, training, elimination processes, and a several month stint as a 'Temporary Prefect'. The motto for the Maxwell School Prefects Board is "Dedicated Prefects Towards Discipline"

Alumni
The alumni association of the school is the Maxwell School Old Boys' Association. It was established in 1956, de-registered in 1983 and was registered again on 13 February 1999. The OBA has a newsletter known as Berita O'Max'', issued quarterly.

Notable alumni include:
 Syed Hamid Albar, Former Home Minister of Malaysia
 Zainal Abidin Hassan, former national football player
 Selvadurai Mahalingam, won the Punjab University Field Hockey championship after 27 years for King Edward Medical College. 
 Yaacob Latiff, second Mayor of Kuala Lumpur

Sources
 National Archives of Malaysia
 The Burning Tiger (Annual School Magazine)
 The Maxwellian (Annual School Magazine)

Secondary schools in Malaysia
Publicly funded schools in Malaysia
Educational institutions established in 1917
1917 establishments in British Malaya
Boys' schools in Malaysia